"Beg" (stylized in all caps) is a song performed by Israeli singers Omer Adam and Netta. The song was released as a digital download on 26 December 2019 as the thirteenth single from Omer Adam's sixth studio album Omer.

Track listing

Charts

Release history

References

2019 singles
2019 songs
Netta Barzilai songs
Hebrew-language songs
Songs written by Doron Medalie
Number-one singles in Israel